Below is a list of covered bridges in Delaware. There are only three authentic covered bridges in the U.S. state of Delaware of which two are historic.  A covered bridge is considered authentic not due to its age, but by its construction. An authentic bridge is constructed using trusses rather than other methods such as stringers, a popular choice for non-authentic covered bridges.

List

See also

 List of bridges on the National Register of Historic Places in Delaware
 World Guide to Covered Bridges

References

External links

 National Society for the Preservation of Covered Bridges
 Only in Your State article about the state's covered bridges

Delaware
 
covered bridges
Bridges, covered